John Scanlan may refer to:

John Joseph Scanlan (1906–1997), second Bishop of the Roman Catholic Diocese of Honolulu in the United States
John Joseph Scanlan (soldier) (1890–1962), Australian Army officer
Seán Scanlan, also known as John O. Scanlan (1937-2017), Irish electrical engineer